Dynamite Athletic Club is a professional football club based in Saint-Marc, Haiti.The club last played in the first division in the 2010–11 season.

References

Football clubs in Haiti
Association football clubs established in 1998
1998 establishments in Haiti
Artibonite (department)